The 1956 Grand Prix motorcycle racing season was the eighth F.I.M. Road Racing World Championship Grand Prix season. The season consisted of six Grand Prix races in five classes: 500cc, 350cc, 250cc, 125cc and Sidecars 500cc. It began on 8 June, with Isle of Man TT and ended with Nations Grand Prix in Italy on 9 September.

1956 Grand Prix season calendar

Standings

Scoring system
Points were awarded to the top six finishers in each race. Only the four best races were counted in all five classes: the Sidecars, 125cc, 250cc,  350cc and 500cc championships.

500cc final standings

350cc Standings

250cc Standings

125cc Standings

References
 Büla, Maurice & Schertenleib, Jean-Claude (2001). Continental Circus 1949-2000. Chronosports S.A. 

Grand Prix motorcycle racing seasons
Grand Prix motorcycle racing season